Tracy Wright (December 7, 1959 – June 22, 2010) was a Canadian actress who was known for her stage and film performances, as well as her presence in Canada's avant-garde for over 20 years.

Career
In 1989, she was a founding member of the Toronto's Augusta Company, along with her future husband Don McKellar and Daniel Brooks, and worked regularly throughout her theatre career with Brooks, McKellar, and Canadian writers and directors including Nadia Ross, Jacob Wren, Daniel MacIvor, Hillar Liitoja, Paul Bettis, and Sky Gilbert.

In film, she worked closely with McKellar and Bruce McDonald whose Highway 61 (1991) was one of her first major film roles; McDonald's This Movie Is Broken and Trigger (both released in 2010) were her last films. She was also known for her roles in films such as Wasaga (1994), When Night Is Falling (1995), Last Night (1998), Elimination Dance (1998), Superstar (1999), Me and You and Everyone We Know (2005), Monkey Warfare (2006), and You Are Here (2010). Highlights of her television appearances include The Kids in the Hall and Twitch City.

Wright also acted in Bob Wiseman's video "We Got Time" in 1989, along with Leslie Spit Treeo and McKellar, and she is the subject of a song by Wiseman, entitled "Mothfaceyahoo.ca" from his 2013 release Giulietta Masina at the Oscars Crying.

Awards
Following her death, Wright and her Trigger co-star Molly Parker jointly won the prize for Best Actress at the 2011 ACTRA Toronto Awards. McKellar accepted the award in her honour, stating in his speech that the award "means more to me than any I've ever won". Wright and Parker were also both nominated for the Genie Award for Best Actress at the 31st Genie Awards.

Personal life 
Wright was married to McKellar, her long-term partner, from January 2010 until her death in June of that year.

She died on June 22, 2010, aged 50, from pancreatic cancer.

Filmography

Film

Television

References

External links

1959 births
2010 deaths
Actresses from Toronto
Canadian film actresses
Canadian stage actresses
Canadian television actresses
Deaths from cancer in Ontario
Deaths from pancreatic cancer
21st-century Canadian actresses
20th-century Canadian actresses